Air Commodore Peter Donald Thorne,  (3 June 1923 – 5 April 2014) was a fighter pilot and test pilot in the Royal Air Force (RAF), who held diplomatic posts in Tehran and Moscow during the 1970s.

Early years
Thorne was born on 3 June 1923 in Eastbourne, East Sussex, to Donald and Olive (née Dyson). He was educated at Culford School in Bury St Edmunds.

Service
In April 1941, Thorne enlisted in the RAF for service in the Second World War, and began flight training while still only 17 years old. He undertook a short course at Edinburgh University and training in Canada, then flew Hawker Typhoons in 193 Squadron (1942-43). He was promoted to flying officer in 1943, with seniority from 3 January. He flew Mustangs in 170 Squadron before leading a training unit in Peterborough.

He re-enlisted after the war, and by 1947 he was a flight commander at RAF Leconfield. He was awarded the Air Force Cross in 1947, with bars in 1951 and 1956. He helped to train Middle East fighter squadrons in Nicosia, Cyprus from 1948 to 1951. He attended the Empire Test Pilots' School in 1951, then was stationed at RAF Boscombe Down. He was senior test pilot on the Supermarine Swift programme.

In 1955, he was first RAF airman fly the English Electric P.1A. He flew supersonic in an F-100 Super Sabre at Edwards Air Force Base, California.

From 1958 to 1960 he was stationed at RAF Sylt, West Germany, where he oversaw three nations' fighter squadrons. He was awarded the OBE in 1960 as a wing commander. At RAF Farnborough from 1965 to 1968 he was in charge of experimental flying.

In the early 1970s he was air attache to Iran. He was defence attache in Moscow during the Brezhnev era and retired as an air commodore.

Later life

Until 1998 he consulted for Huntings Engineering and Lockheed Martin. He later volunteered for the Duxford Aviation Society and the Imperial War Museum.

Personal life

In 1951 Thorne married Mary, a WAAF radio operator. Mary died in 2013. They had four children and seven grandchildren.

References

1923 births
2014 deaths
British World War II pilots
British test pilots
Officers of the Order of the British Empire
People educated at Culford School
Recipients of the Air Force Cross (United Kingdom)
Royal Air Force officers
Royal Air Force personnel of World War II